Beit Saber (also spelled Beit Sabir) is a village in southern Syria, administratively part of the Qatana District of the Rif Dimashq Governorate, located just southwest of Damascus. Nearby localities include Khan al-Shih to the northeast, Kafr Hawr and Beitima to the north, and Beit Jinn to the west, Harfa to the southwest and Sa'sa' to the south. According to the Syria Central Bureau of Statistics (CBS), Beit Saber had a population of 3,021 in the 2004 census.

Beit Saber is located on the banks of one of the lower tributaries of the Awaj River which originates from Mount Hermon. The name of the tributary is Sabirany, which derives from the name of the village "Saber."

History
Medieval Muslim historian Abu'l Fida mentioned Beit Saber in the late 14th century, during Mamluk rule in Syria.

In 1838, Eli Smith noted that Beit Saber's population was Sunni Muslim.

During the 1973 Arab-Israeli War Beit Saber was shelled by Israeli artillery, resulting in the destruction of two houses. The attack prompted an inquiry by the United Nations.

References

Bibliography

 

Populated places in Qatana District